Bostrichiformia is an infraorder of polyphagan beetles.

It contains two superfamilies, Derodontoidea and Bostrichoidea, which includes the Dermestidae, Ptinidae, Bostrichidae and others.

References

 
Insect infraorders
Taxa named by William Trowbridge Merrifield Forbes